The 2018 Buffalo Bills season was the franchise's 49th season in the National Football League, and the 59th overall.  The season also marked the fourth full season under the ownership of Terry and Kim Pegula and their second under the head coach/general manager tandem of Sean McDermott and Brandon Beane. The team previously finished with a 9–7 record in 2017 and returned to the playoffs for the first time after having not been to the playoffs since 1999. After a 21–17 loss to the rival Miami Dolphins in Week 13, the Bills failed to match their 9–7 record from the previous season. They were officially eliminated from playoff contention the following week with a 27–23 loss to the New York Jets, ultimately finishing with a 6–10 record as numerous players from the previous season departed via trades, roster cuts or retirement. They went 4–3 in their last 7 games. This season was also notable for being the first season for quarterback Josh Allen and the last one for longtime defensive tackle Kyle Williams. As of the most recent season, this is the only time where Coach Sean McDermott has not led the Bills to the playoffs.

Until the 2022 season, this was the last time the Bills lost to the Dolphins.

Offseason
On May 1, 2018, three weeks after the 2017–18 Buffalo Sabres season ended, team president Russ Brandon announced his resignation from Pegula Sports and Entertainment. In a statement to the press, Brandon stated that the departure had been planned since he had reached 20 years with the Bills in November 2017 and that he fulfilled his duties to the Bills and Sabres for the remainder of the Sabres' season before tendering his resignation. A report in The Buffalo News claimed that Brandon had been subject to an internal investigation regarding inappropriate relationships with female employees; neither the Bills, Sabres nor Brandon mentioned such in their statements.

Transactions

Front office changes

Free Agency

Arrivals

Departures

Draft

Draft trades
The Bills traded their first- and second-round selections (12th, 53rd and 56th overall) to the Tampa Bay Buccaneers in exchange for Tampa Bay's first- and seventh-round selections (7th and 255th overall).
The Bills traded their first- and third-round selections (22nd and 65th overall) to the Baltimore Ravens in exchange for Baltimore's first- and fifth-round selections (16th and 154th overall)
The Bills traded their first- and fifth-round selections (21st and 158th overall) and offensive tackle Cordy Glenn to the Cincinnati Bengals in exchange for Cincinnati's first- and sixth-round selections (12th and 187th overall).
The Bills traded their first-round selection in 2017 (10th overall) to the Kansas City Chiefs in exchange for Kansas City's first-round selection (22nd overall) as well as their first- and third-round selections in 2017 (27th and 91st overall).
The Bills traded their sixth-round selection (195th overall) and wide receiver Sammy Watkins to the Los Angeles Rams in exchange for the Rams' second-round selection (56th overall) and cornerback E.J. Gaines.
The Bills traded quarterback Tyrod Taylor to the Cleveland Browns in exchange for Cleveland's third-round selection (65th).
The Bills traded their third-round selection (85th overall), quarterback Cardale Jones and the seventh-round selection they acquired from the Los Angeles Chargers (234th overall) to the Carolina Panthers in exchange for wide receiver Kelvin Benjamin.
The Bills traded cornerback Ronald Darby to the Philadelphia Eagles in exchange for Philadelphia's third-round selection (96th overall) and wide receiver Jordan Matthews.
The Bills traded defensive tackle Marcell Dareus to the Jacksonville Jaguars in exchange for a conditional sixth-round selection, which became a fifth-round selection (166th overall) after Dareus remained on Jacksonville's roster for the remainder of the 2017 season and the Jaguars made the playoffs.
The Bills traded their seventh-round selection (239th overall) to the Green Bay Packers in exchange for linebacker Lerentee McCray.

Trades

Staff

Final roster

Preseason
The Bills' preseason opponents and schedule was announced on April 11, 2018. For the first time since 2001, the Detroit Lions, who the Bills played in Week 15, were not included on the preseason schedule.

Regular season

Schedule
The Bills' 2018 schedule was announced on April 19, 2018.

Note: Intra-division opponents are in bold text.

Game summaries

Week 1: at Baltimore Ravens

Played in heavy rain, the lopsided game saw a dominant performance from Ravens QB Joe Flacco, who completed 25 of 34 passes for 236 yards and three touchdowns against the Bills defense before handing the reigns off to rookie Lamar Jackson. Buffalo was unable to keep pace on offense, finishing without a first down until the third quarter. Bills QB Nathan Peterman completed just 5/18 attempts for 24 yards and two interceptions, good for a 0.0 passer rating before being benched for rookie Josh Allen in the third quarter. With a final score of 47–3 in favor of Baltimore, Buffalo suffered its worst season-opening loss ever and opened the 2018 season 0–1.

Week 2: vs. Los Angeles Chargers

QB Josh Allen made his first career start in place of Nathan Peterman. This was also CB Vontae Davis' last game in the NFL as he abruptly retired during halftime after 10 seasons. Veteran LB Lorenzo Alexander called Davis' decision "disrespectful" and that he had "never seen it, ever." Star RB LeSean McCoy left the game after suffering a strained rib muscle early in the second half.

Week 3: at Minnesota Vikings

In Josh Allen's second NFL start, he went 15/22 for 196 yards and a TD, earning him a 111.2 passer rating. He also added 39 rushing yards and two rushing touchdowns. The defense also sacked Vikings QB Kirk Cousins four times and intercepted him once. The Bills won this game despite being 16.5-point betting underdogs.

Week 4: at Green Bay Packers

Despite holding the Aaron Rodgers-led Packers offense to just 22 points and forcing two turnovers, which included a Jordan Poyer interception, the Bills were unable to garner any points. With the team's first shutout loss since 2008, Buffalo fell to 1–3.

Week 5: vs. Tennessee Titans

With RB LeSean McCoy back to full health, the Bills maintained a run-heavy offensive game plan. QB Josh Allen scored his third rushing touchdown of the season and the Bills held the Titans offense, led by QB Marcus Mariota, in check in a defensive battle, aided by a Taron Johnson interception in the second quarter. The Bills maintained the lead throughout the game until the fourth quarter, but sealed the win with a 46-yard Steven Hauschka FG as time expired, improving the Bills to 2–3 on the season.

Week 6: at Houston Texans

The Bills defense only allowed 216 yards from the Texans offense, sacking QB Deshaun Watson seven times and forcing three turnovers, but an inept performance by special teams gave the Texans good field position in the first half as Houston jumped to a 10-0 halftime lead. After leading the Bills to a field goal and moving the offense back into Texans territory a few drives later, Josh Allen was injured by a late hit from Texans LB Whitney Mercilus and was replaced by Nathan Peterman, who put the Bills in the lead with a touchdown pass to WR Zay Jones. However, after Houston tied the game at 13-13 late in the fourth quarter, Peterman threw two interceptions, including a pick-six to Texans CB Johnathan Joseph, which sealed the loss for Buffalo, dropping the team to 2–4.

Week 7: at Indianapolis Colts

After Allen's injury in the previous game against the Texans and Peterman's poor performance in his relief, recently signed third-stringer Derek Anderson was named the starter on October 17, 2018. Sadly, not even Anderson could help the Bills, who suffered their worst loss since Week 1, as they were on the wrong end of a final score of 37–5, dropping to 2–5. This was the first NFL game to ever end in the score of 37–5.

Week 8: vs. New England Patriots

In the first Monday Night Football game hosted by Buffalo since losing to the Cleveland Browns, the Bills defense held up again, holding QB Tom Brady out of the end zone and limiting the Patriots to three Stephen Gostkowski field goals in the first half, but a late rushing touchdown by Patriots RB James White and a subsequent pick-six by CB Devin McCourty sealed yet another Patriots win over the Bills, with McCourty's interception occurring immediately after an overturned touchdown pass from Derek Anderson to Bills TE Jason Croom. The Bills retired RB Thurman Thomas' No. 34 jersey during halftime, with longtime ESPN host Chris Berman delivering the introductory speech.

Week 9: vs. Chicago Bears

After Derek Anderson suffered a concussion in the previous game, Nathan Peterman made the start with the team with Josh Allen still out. The Bills continued their losing skid to four games with the 41–9 loss and fell to 2–7, matching their loss total from all of 2017.

Week 10: at New York Jets

Recently signed quarterback Matt Barkley was named the starter against the New York Jets. The Bills snapped their four-game losing streak, dominating the Jets 41–10. Barkley's efficient performance in the win, coupled with the improving health of Josh Allen, led to the release of Nathan Peterman the following evening.

Week 12: vs. Jacksonville Jaguars

In a rematch of the 2017 wild-card game with the Jacksonville Jaguars, the Bills attained an early 14–0 lead, thanks to a rushing touchdown by newly signed WR/KR Isaiah McKenzie and a 75-yard touchdown strike from Josh Allen to WR Robert Foster. However, Jacksonville fought back with two rushing touchdowns from RB Leonard Fournette in the second quarter. Jacksonville was in position to claim the lead in the third quarter following a 30-yard reception by WR Donte Moncrief that put the Jaguars at the Bills 1-yard line, but a brawl that led to Fournette and Bills DE Shaq Lawson getting ejected plus two penalties on the Jaguars and defensive stops by the Bills forced the Jaguars to settle for a field goal attempt by Josh Lambo, who promptly missed. The Bills then reclaimed the lead the following drive with a 14-yard touchdown run by Allen, then iced the game with a Jordan Poyer interception of QB Blake Bortles and subsequent Stephen Hauschka field goal, which was too much for Jacksonville to overcome despite scoring a touchdown afterwards. With the win, the Bills improved to 4–7.

Week 13: at Miami Dolphins

Buffalo outgained Miami in terms of total offense, with 415 yards compared to just 175, but their struggles on special teams and penalties gave the Dolphins short fields and allowed QB Ryan Tannehill to pass for three touchdowns, including the eventual 13-yard game winner to WR Kenny Stills. The game came down to the final moments, when Josh Allen, who compiled 366 total yards on the day, attempted a fourth down pass to TE Charles Clay, who dropped it just outside the end zone. The failed conversion sealed the loss for the Bills as the team fell to 4–8.

Week 14: vs. New York Jets

A late touchdown by Jets running back Elijah McGuire proved to be the game-winning score with just over a minute left. With the loss, the Bills fell to 4–9 and were eliminated from playoff contention. Linebacker Matt Milano suffered a broken fibula late in the game, ending his season.

Week 15: vs. Detroit Lions

With running backs LeSean McCoy and Chris Ivory both injured, the Bills relied offensively on Josh Allen and backup halfbacks Marcus Murphy and Keith Ford, who both left the game at some point with their own injuries. Allen passed for 204 yards and a touchdown, adding a rushing score on 16 yards on the ground, as the Bills defense stifled the Lions offense throughout the game except the second quarter. Lions kicker Matt Prater missed a field goal and was unable to kick an extra point earlier due to a botched snap, allowing the Bills to win 14–13.

Week 16: at New England Patriots

Allen's first game against the New England Patriots did not fare well for the Bills, as the Patriots won the game 24–12 to clinch the AFC East. In addition, the Bills' special teams unit struggled again. However, the defense was able to limit Tom Brady to just 126 passing yards, one touchdown with two interceptions, but also gave up a massive 273 rushing yards on 47 carries as they were torched by the Patriots rushing offense in the ugly loss.

Week 17: vs. Miami Dolphins

Similar to the previous year's season finale, a fight broke out between the Bills and Dolphins in the second half. After Dolphins linebacker and former Bill Kiko Alonso collided with Josh Allen, Alonso, along with Dolphins DE Robert Quinn and Bills lineman Jordan Mills, were ejected following the scuffle. Despite a close first half, the Bills won 42–17 to finish the 2018 season at 6–10. This was also the final NFL game for longtime defensive tackle Kyle Williams, as he announced his intention to retire after the season's conclusion.

Standings

Division

Conference

References

External links
 

Buffalo
Buffalo Bills seasons
Buffalo Bills